The 2007 Cork Senior Football Championship was the 119th staging of the Cork Senior Football Championship since its establishment by the Cork County Board in 1887. The draw for the opening fixtures took place on 10 December 2006. The championship began on 7 April 2007 and ended on 28 October 2007.

Nemo Rangers entered the championship as the defending champions.

On 28 October 2007, Nemo Rangers won the championship following a 0-12 to 0-09 defeat of Ilen Rovers in the final. This was their 16th championship title overall and their third title in succession.

Nemo's James Masters was the championship's top scorer with 2-29.

Team changes

To Championship

Promoted from the Cork Premier Intermediate Football Championship
 St. Vincent's

From Championship

Relegated to the Cork Premier Intermediate Football Championship
 Mallow
 St Michael's

Results

Preliminary round

Round 1

Round 2

Relegation playoffs

Divisional/colleges section

Round 3

Round 4

Quarter-finals

Semi-finals

Final

Championship statistics

Top scorers

Overall

In a single game

References

Cork Senior Football Championship
Cork Senior Football Championship